In geometry, the truncated octagonal tiling is a semiregular tiling of the hyperbolic plane. There is one triangle and two hexakaidecagons on each vertex. It has Schläfli symbol of t{8,3}.

Dual tiling
The dual tiling has face configuration V3.16.16.

Related polyhedra and tilings 
This hyperbolic tiling is topologically related as a part of sequence of uniform truncated polyhedra with vertex configurations (3.2n.2n), and [n,3] Coxeter group symmetry.

From a Wythoff construction there are ten hyperbolic uniform tilings that can be based from the regular octagonal tiling. 

Drawing the tiles colored as red on the original faces, yellow at the original vertices, and blue along the original edges, there are 8 forms.

See also 

 Truncated hexagonal tiling
 Octagonal tiling
 Tilings of regular polygons
 List of uniform tilings

References
 John H. Conway, Heidi Burgiel, Chaim Goodman-Strass, The Symmetries of Things 2008,  (Chapter 19, The Hyperbolic Archimedean Tessellations)

External links 

 Hyperbolic and Spherical Tiling Gallery
 KaleidoTile 3: Educational software to create spherical, planar and hyperbolic tilings
 Hyperbolic Planar Tessellations, Don Hatch

Hyperbolic tilings
Isogonal tilings
Semiregular tilings
Truncated tilings
Octagonal tilings